Mishki versus Yudenich is a 1925 Soviet silent comedy film directed by Grigori Kozintsev and Leonid Trauberg. Acting debut of Yanina Zhejmo. The film is believed to be lost.

Plot
The film is a comedy about adventures of a boy named Mishka and a bear at the headquarters of General Nikolai Yudenich during the Russian Civil War, which had been fought between 1917 and 1922.

Cast
 Alexander Zavyalov as Mishka, paperboy
 Polina Pona as white spy
 Sergei Gerasimov as shpik
 Andrei Kostrichkin as shpik
 Yevgeny Kumeyko as General Yudenich
 Emil Gal as photographer
 Yanina Zhejmo as youngster

References

External links

1925 films
Lenfilm films
Soviet black-and-white films
1925 comedy films
Soviet comedy films
Russian comedy films
Soviet silent short films
Lost Russian films
Films directed by Grigori Kozintsev
Films directed by Leonid Trauberg
1925 lost films
Lost comedy films
Russian black-and-white films
Lost Soviet films
Silent comedy films